Aleksandr Anatolyevich Bodyalov (born 11 July 1977) is a former Russian professional football player.

Club career
He played 11 seasons in the Russian Football National League for FC Chita.

References

External links
 

1977 births
People from Krasnokamensky District
Living people
Russian footballers
Association football defenders
FC Chita players
Sportspeople from Zabaykalsky Krai